James Cory Snyder (born November 11, 1962) is an American former professional baseball right fielder and the manager of the Northern Colorado Owlz. He played nine seasons in Major League Baseball (MLB) from 1986 to 1994 for the Cleveland Indians, Chicago White Sox, Toronto Blue Jays, San Francisco Giants, and Los Angeles Dodgers, earning a total of $5.7 million. He was known for his powerful throwing arm. He is on the list of Major League Baseball career assists as a right fielder leaders and the list of college baseball career home run leaders. He is currently an automobile salesperson in Lindon, Utah.

Early life
Snyder grew up in Canyon Country, Santa Clarita, California, and started playing baseball when he was 6 or 7 years old. When he was 8 years old, he joined Little League Baseball. His father was a pitcher in the Milwaukee Braves organization for three years until he hurt his arm. Snyder attended Canyon High School.

Career

Playing career
Snyder received a full baseball scholarship to Brigham Young University, where he played for the BYU Cougars baseball team. In his first game with BYU, during his first three at-bats, he hit three home runs on three consecutive pitches. He was named 1982 Freshman of the Year.

In 1983, Snyder played collegiate summer baseball for the Harwich Mariners of the Cape Cod Baseball League (CCBL). He batted .321 for the season, belting a league-record 22 home runs, including homers in four consecutive at-bats on July 7–8. Snyder led the Mariners to the league title, and was named the league's outstanding pro prospect. He was inducted into the Cape Cod Baseball League Hall of Fame in 2003. Snyder played for the USA team in the 1983 Pan American Games in Venezuela and is on the list of Pan American Games medalists in baseball.

In early 1984, he moved to Camarillo, California. In June 1984, Snyder was drafted by the Cleveland Indians as the 4th overall pick in the 1st round of the 1984 Major League Baseball draft. He was on the 1984 College Baseball All-America Team.

In August 1984, in the 1984 Summer Olympics, Snyder was on the first United States national baseball team, which earned a silver medal in baseball at the 1984 Summer Olympics.

In 1985, Snyder received the Eastern League Most Valuable Player Award.

In May 1986, while playing for the Maine Guides, Snyder was sued after an incident where he threw his bat towards the backstop, but due to pine tar in his hands, it flew into the stands and hit two women sitting in the front row, breaking one of their noses and cracking the dental plate and bloodying the lip of the other. A judge dismissed the charges in the criminal case. In March 1988, Snyder settled the civil charges out of court.

In June 1986, Snyder was called up to the major leagues.

In 1986, he finished 4th in AL Rookie of the Year voting.

In 1987, along with teammate Joe Carter, Snyder appeared on the cover of Sports Illustrated.

In 1989, he suffered a back injury after diving for a ball. A slump in performance followed, leading to an adverse relationship between Snyder and team officials.

On December 4, 1990, the Cleveland Indians traded Snyder to the Chicago White Sox for pitchers Eric King and Shawn Hillegas. His salary was set by an arbitrator at $800,000, a $100,000 raise. There, coach Walt Hriniak forced him to change his hitting style, which Snyder believes was for the worse. He also had a strained relationship with manager Jeff Torborg after being told he would only play part-time. In July 1991, the White Sox traded Snyder to the Toronto Blue Jays for Shawn Jeter and a player to be named later.

In March 1992, after being released by the Toronto Blue Jays, Snyder was signed by the San Francisco Giants. In June 1992, he received the NL Major League Baseball Player of the Month Award. In December 1992, he was signed by the Los Angeles Dodgers to a two-year contract at $1.5 million per year. He retired from the major leagues after the 1994–95 Major League Baseball strike. Snyder's total earnings from major league baseball teams was $5,740,000.

In March 1995, he was signed by the San Diego Padres to a contract with Las Vegas of the Pacific Coast League.

In February 1997, Snyder unsuccessfully tried out for the St. Louis Cardinals.

Coaching career

In 1998, at age 37, Snyder began to think about a career in coaching. At that time, he lived in Laguna Hills, California, where he taught kids baseball in his backyard. He also owned a sporting goods store.

In December 2001, he opened a baseball facility in Lindon, Utah.

In March 2006, Snyder received a 10-day assignment to assist in coaching the minor league players of the Cleveland Indians.

From 2007 to 2009, Snyder managed the St. George Roadrunners of the Golden Baseball League. In 2008, he also managed the San Diego Surf Dawgs. In 2010, he managed the Na Koa Ikaika Maui, of the North American League.

Snyder joined the Seattle Mariners organization as a coach for the Jackson Generals in 2011-2013 and Tacoma Rainiers in 2014-2015.

He managed Pericos de Puebla in the Mexican League, leading the team to their first championship in 30 years by defeating the Tijuana Toros. He is only the fourth American manager to win Mexico's highest professional level baseball championship.

In 2017-2018, Snyder managed the CTBC Brothers baseball team of the Chinese Professional Baseball League (CPBL).

In February 2019, Snyder became Director of Public Relations for the Orem Owlz, a Minor League Baseball team.

In February 2022, Snyder was named manager of the Northern Colorado Owlz.

Post-sports career
In 2020, Snyder became an automobile salesperson for Murdock Hyundai in Lindon, Utah.

Personal life
Snyder and his wife Tina have been married since 1985 and have six children, Ashley, Amberley, JC, Taylor, Aubrey, and Autumn. They are members of the Church of Jesus Christ of Latter-day Saints and Snyder does not drink alcohol due to his religion. In 1991, Snyder was featured in a public relations campaign by the church to improve the reputation of Mormonism.

In 1998, he moved to Mapleton, Utah.

Amberley Snyder, involved in professional barrel racing, was paralyzed from the waist down after a car accident in January 2010 when she was 19 years old. She is the subject of the biopic Walk. Ride. Rodeo., produced and distributed by Netflix. Cory was portrayed in the film by Bailey Chase.

Snyder enjoys playing golf and had a 2 handicap.

References

External links

1962 births
Living people
All-American college baseball players
American expatriate baseball people in Mexico
American expatriate baseball people in Taiwan
American expatriate baseball players in Canada
American Latter Day Saints
Baseball players at the 1983 Pan American Games
Baseball players at the 1984 Summer Olympics
Baseball players from Inglewood, California
BYU Cougars baseball players
Canton-Akron Indians players
Chicago White Sox players
Cleveland Indians players
CTBC Brothers managers
Harwich Mariners players
Las Vegas Stars (baseball) players
Los Angeles Dodgers players
Major League Baseball outfielders
Maine Guides players
Medalists at the 1983 Pan American Games
Medalists at the 1984 Summer Olympics
Mexican League baseball managers
Minor league baseball managers
Olympic silver medalists for the United States in baseball
Pan American Games bronze medalists for the United States
Pan American Games medalists in baseball
Pawtucket Red Sox players
San Francisco Giants players
Syracuse Chiefs players
Toronto Blue Jays players
Waterbury Indians players
Anchorage Glacier Pilots players